The Larkin Skylark is single-engine amphibious homebuilt aircraft. Only one aircraft was built and flown in 1973.

Design
The Skylark is a pusher-style design with a single Volkswagen air-cooled engine above and behind the fully enclosed cockpit. The cockpit seats two occupants in side-by-side configuration, with a large Plexiglas canopy curving around both occupants. The tail is a twin-boom arrangement attached at the trailing edge of the wings, allowing clearance for the pusher propeller above and within the booms. The landing gear is a tricycle arrangement with the nose gear positioned at the foremost point of the nose and the two main gear semi-recessed into teardrop-shaped fairings on the lower sides. The fuselage and landing gear are internally supported with an aluminum tube keel.
 
The Skylark is capable of amphibious operation when fitted with an optional V-shaped lower hull made out of fiberglass.

Specifications

See also

References

 International Aircraft Directory, 3rd edition

1970s United States civil utility aircraft
Flying boats
Homebuilt aircraft
Skylark
Single-engined pusher aircraft
Twin-boom aircraft
High-wing aircraft
Aircraft first flown in 1973